

Erskine is a locality in the Australian state of South Australia located about  north of the state capital of Adelaide and about  north-east of the municipal seat in Orroroo.

Its boundaries were created on 16 December 1999 for the “long established name” and includes the site of the now-ceased Government Town of Dawlish.  Its name is derived from the cadastral unit of the Hundred of Erskine which it shares with the locality of Orroroo and which was named after William West-Erskine, a former member of the South Australian Parliament.

Land use within the locality is ’primary production’ and is concerned with “agricultural production and the grazing of stock on relatively large holdings.”  Some land in its south has been gazetted as a protected area known as the Black Rock Conservation Park.

Erskine is located within the federal division of Grey, the state electoral district of Stuart and the local government area of the District Council of Orroroo Carrieton.

See also
Erskine (disambiguation)

References

 

Towns in South Australia